SMART Multicast is an experimental method of Secure Reliable IP Multicast. It allows a user to forward IP datagrams to an unlimited group of receivers.  See the article on multicast for a general discussion of this subject - this article is specifically about SMART IP Multicast.

SMART Multicast Uses 
IP Multicast has been successfully deployed in private and controlled networking environments, for example; IP over fiber - cable TV operators, educational institutions with significant on-campus student housing and financial sector applications such as stock tickers and hoot-n-holler systems. However, IP multicast has been slow to be adopted in the interdomain routing environment. This is because the current interdomain infrastructure lacks the necessary tools to efficiently handle packet loss and the security needed to create a functional business model.

SMART IP Multicast is an experimental protocol that enables the interdomain transmission of Secure Reliable IP Multicast, thus overcoming the challenges of deploying wide area interdomain IP Multicast transmissions. SMART IP Multicast reduces the complexity of deploying wide area IP Multicast in the same way MFTP (Multicast File Transfer Protocol) accomplishes this goal for file transfer, namely allowing for security and reliability to have full interoperability. 
 
IP Multicast file distribution has been the most successful use of IP Multicast within campus and commercial networks. For file distribution most have used some variant of the experimental protocol MFTP (Multicast File Transfer Protocol). MFTP is both secure and reliable and runs on top of IP Multicast protocol. Like MFTP, SMART Multicast is a wrapper that runs on top of IP Multicast, taking advantage of IP Multicast's efficiency. SMART Multicasts are secure, reliable and provide for bi-directional feedback.

For more info see RFC3170 - IP Multicast Applications: Challenges & Solutions

History and Milestones 
SMART supports an MBONE like implementation multicast between sites through the use of dynamically allocated Multicast tunnels. SMART takes advantage of SIMPLE (Self Implementing Multicast Protocol Level Escalation)

Experimental SMART Protocol Structure 

Packet structure for SRM-P2MP

DATA PACKET Message TYP = 0x00 (binary 00)

ACCESS_SYNCH_CODE 8
PACKET_TYPE       2
CMD               2
RESERVED          4
PACKET SIZE      16
PACKET_NUMBER    16
PACKET FORMAT     2
DECRYPT_Y_N       1
QUIET             4
RESERVED          1
[...PAYLOAD]

      0                   1                   2                   3
       0 1 2 3 4 5 6 7 8 9 0 1 2 3 4 5 6 7 8 9 0 1 2 3 4 5 6 7 8 9 0 1
      +-+-+-+-+-+-+-+-+-+-+-+-+-+-+-+-+-+-+-+-+-+-+-+-+-+-+-+-+-+-+-+-+
      | Access Synch  | TYP  CMD RESRV|         Packet Size           |
      +-+-+-+-+-+-+-+-+-+-+-+-+-+-+-+-+-+-+-+-+-+-+-+-+-+-+-+-+-+-+-+-+
      |      Packet Sequence          | FMT D  QUIET R    RESERVED    |
      +-+-+-+-+-+-+-+-+-+-+-+-+-+-+-+-+-+-+-+-+-+-+-+-+-+-+-+-+-+-+-+-+
      |                          Payload [1]                          |
      +-                                                             -+
      |                          ...........                          |
      +-+-+-+-+-+-+-+-+-+-+-+-+-+-+-+-+-+-+-+-+-+-+-+-+-+-+-+-+-+-+-+-+
(6 bits 64 types)

MESSAGES   Message TYP = 0x01 (binary 1)

ACCESS_SYNCH_CODE 8
PACKET_TYPE       2
CMD               6
PACKET_SIZE       16
[...PAYLOAD]

ADDR_RANGE CHANGE  CMD  = 01  (binary 000001)
 
    0                   1                   2                   3
       0 1 2 3 4 5 6 7 8 9 0 1 2 3 4 5 6 7 8 9 0 1 2 3 4 5 6 7 8 9 0 1
      +-+-+-+-+-+-+-+-+-+-+-+-+-+-+-+-+-+-+-+-+-+-+-+-+-+-+-+-+-+-+-+-+
      | Access Synch  | TYP  CMD      |         Packet Size           |
      +-+-+-+-+-+-+-+-+-+-+-+-+-+-+-+-+-+-+-+-+-+-+-+-+-+-+-+-+-+-+-+-+
      |                          Address [1]                          |
      +-                                                             -+
      |                          Address [2]                          |
      +-+-+-+-+-+-+-+-+-+-+-+-+-+-+-+-+-+-+-+-+-+-+-+-+-+-+-+-+-+-+-+-+
 
USAGE_REPORT_JOIN CMD =  0x0002 (binary 000010)
 
   0                   1                   2                   3
       0 1 2 3 4 5 6 7 8 9 0 1 2 3 4 5 6 7 8 9 0 1 2 3 4 5 6 7 8 9 0 1
      +-+-+-+-+-+-+-+-+-+-+-+-+-+-+-+-+-+-+-+-+-+-+-+-+-+-+-+-+-+-+-+-+
      | Access Synch  | TYP  CMD RESRV|         Packet Size           |
      +-+-+-+-+-+-+-+-+-+-+-+-+-+-+-+-+-+-+-+-+-+-+-+-+-+-+-+-+-+-+-+-+
      |                          Address [1]                          |
      +-                                                             -+
      |                          Address [2]                          |
      +-+-+-+-+-+-+-+-+-+-+-+-+-+-+-+-+-+-+-+-+-+-+-+-+-+-+-+-+-+-+-+-+
 
USAGE_REPORT_LEAVE CMD =  0x0003 (binary 000011)
 
   0                   1                   2                   3
       0 1 2 3 4 5 6 7 8 9 0 1 2 3 4 5 6 7 8 9 0 1 2 3 4 5 6 7 8 9 0 1
      +-+-+-+-+-+-+-+-+-+-+-+-+-+-+-+-+-+-+-+-+-+-+-+-+-+-+-+-+-+-+-+-+
      | Access Synch  | TYP  CMD RESRV|         Packet Size           |
      +-+-+-+-+-+-+-+-+-+-+-+-+-+-+-+-+-+-+-+-+-+-+-+-+-+-+-+-+-+-+-+-+
      |                          Address [1]                          |
      +-                                                             -+
      |                          Address [2]                          |
      +-+-+-+-+-+-+-+-+-+-+-+-+-+-+-+-+-+-+-+-+-+-+-+-+-+-+-+-+-+-+-+-+

ERROR_REPORT CMD =  0x000B (binary 001011)
 
   0                   1                   2                   3
       0 1 2 3 4 5 6 7 8 9 0 1 2 3 4 5 6 7 8 9 0 1 2 3 4 5 6 7 8 9 0 1
      +-+-+-+-+-+-+-+-+-+-+-+-+-+-+-+-+-+-+-+-+-+-+-+-+-+-+-+-+-+-+-+-+
      | Access Synch  | TYP  CMD RESRV|         Packet Size           |
      +-+-+-+-+-+-+-+-+-+-+-+-+-+-+-+-+-+-+-+-+-+-+-+-+-+-+-+-+-+-+-+-+
      |                     Reporting Address [1]                     |
      +-                                                             -+
      |                   Concerning   Address [2]                    |
      +-+-+-+-+-+-+-+-+-+-+-+-+-+-+-+-+-+-+-+-+-+-+-+-+-+-+-+-+-+-+-+-+
      |                        Message Data [1]                       |
      +-                                                             -+
      |                        Message Data [2]                       |
      +-                                                             -+
      |                        Message Data [3]                       |
      +-+-+-+-+-+-+-+-+-+-+-+-+-+-+-+-+-+-+-+-+-+-+-+-+-+-+-+-+-+-+-+-+

PROBLEM_REPORT CMD =  0x0010 Binary (010000)
 
   0                   1                   2                   3
       0 1 2 3 4 5 6 7 8 9 0 1 2 3 4 5 6 7 8 9 0 1 2 3 4 5 6 7 8 9 0 1
      +-+-+-+-+-+-+-+-+-+-+-+-+-+-+-+-+-+-+-+-+-+-+-+-+-+-+-+-+-+-+-+-+
      | Access Synch  | TYP  CMD RESRV|         Packet Size           |
      +-+-+-+-+-+-+-+-+-+-+-+-+-+-+-+-+-+-+-+-+-+-+-+-+-+-+-+-+-+-+-+-+
      |                     Reporting Address [1]                     |
      +-                                                             -+
      |                   Concerning   Address [2]                    |
      +-+-+-+-+-+-+-+-+-+-+-+-+-+-+-+-+-+-+-+-+-+-+-+-+-+-+-+-+-+-+-+-+
      |                        Message Data [1]                       |
      +-                                                             -+
      |                        Message Data [2]                       |
      +-                                                             -+
      |                        Message Data [3]                       |
      +-+-+-+-+-+-+-+-+-+-+-+-+-+-+-+-+-+-+-+-+-+-+-+-+-+-+-+-+-+-+-+-+
MESSAGES   Message TYP = 0x02 (binary 10)  Replacement Requests

ACCESS_SYNCH_CODE 8
PACKET_TYPE       2
CMD               6
PACKET_SIZE       16
[...PAYLOAD]

 REPLACEMENT CMD  = 01  (binary 000001)
 
    0                   1                   2                   3
       0 1 2 3 4 5 6 7 8 9 0 1 2 3 4 5 6 7 8 9 0 1 2 3 4 5 6 7 8 9 0 1
      +-+-+-+-+-+-+-+-+-+-+-+-+-+-+-+-+-+-+-+-+-+-+-+-+-+-+-+-+-+-+-+-+
      | Access Synch  | TYP  CMD      |         Packet Size           |
      +-+-+-+-+-+-+-+-+-+-+-+-+-+-+-+-+-+-+-+-+-+-+-+-+-+-+-+-+-+-+-+-+
      |                       Multicast Address [1]                   |
      +-                                                             -+
      |           Sequence #          |                               |
      +-+-+-+-+-+-+-+-+-+-+-+-+-+-+-+-+-+-+-+-+-+-+-+-+-+-+-+-+-+-+-+-+
 
 
QUIET =  0x0002 (binary 000010)
 
   0                   1                   2                   3
       0 1 2 3 4 5 6 7 8 9 0 1 2 3 4 5 6 7 8 9 0 1 2 3 4 5 6 7 8 9 0 1
      +-+-+-+-+-+-+-+-+-+-+-+-+-+-+-+-+-+-+-+-+-+-+-+-+-+-+-+-+-+-+-+-+
      | Access Synch  | TYP  CMD RESRV|         Packet Size           |
      +-+-+-+-+-+-+-+-+-+-+-+-+-+-+-+-+-+-+-+-+-+-+-+-+-+-+-+-+-+-+-+-+
      |                       Multicast Address [1]                   |
      +-                                                             -+
      |           Duration #          |                               |
      +-+-+-+-+-+-+-+-+-+-+-+-+-+-+-+-+-+-+-+-+-+-+-+-+-+-+-+-+-+-+-+-+

MESSAGES   Message TYP = 0x03 (binary 11)  Tunneling Requests

ACCESS_SYNCH_CODE 8
PACKET_TYPE       2
CMD               6
PACKET_SIZE       16
[...PAYLOAD]

 REQUEST_TUNNEL      CMD  = 01  (binary 000001)
 
    0                   1                   2                   3
       0 1 2 3 4 5 6 7 8 9 0 1 2 3 4 5 6 7 8 9 0 1 2 3 4 5 6 7 8 9 0 1
      +-+-+-+-+-+-+-+-+-+-+-+-+-+-+-+-+-+-+-+-+-+-+-+-+-+-+-+-+-+-+-+-+
      | Access Synch  | TYP  CMD      |         Packet Size           |
      +-+-+-+-+-+-+-+-+-+-+-+-+-+-+-+-+-+-+-+-+-+-+-+-+-+-+-+-+-+-+-+-+
      |                          Address [1]                          |
      +-                                                             -+
      |                          Address [2]                          |
      +-+-+-+-+-+-+-+-+-+-+-+-+-+-+-+-+-+-+-+-+-+-+-+-+-+-+-+-+-+-+-+-+
 
 
LEAVE_TUNNEL =  0x0002 (binary 000010)
 
   0                   1                   2                   3
       0 1 2 3 4 5 6 7 8 9 0 1 2 3 4 5 6 7 8 9 0 1 2 3 4 5 6 7 8 9 0 1
      +-+-+-+-+-+-+-+-+-+-+-+-+-+-+-+-+-+-+-+-+-+-+-+-+-+-+-+-+-+-+-+-+
      | Access Synch  | TYP  CMD RESRV|         Packet Size           |
      +-+-+-+-+-+-+-+-+-+-+-+-+-+-+-+-+-+-+-+-+-+-+-+-+-+-+-+-+-+-+-+-+
      |                          Address [1]                          |
      +-                                                             -+
      |                          Address [2]                          |
      +-+-+-+-+-+-+-+-+-+-+-+-+-+-+-+-+-+-+-+-+-+-+-+-+-+-+-+-+-+-+-+-+

Addressing 

There are four forms of IP addressing, each with its own unique properties.

 Unicast: The most common concept of an IP address is a unicast address. It normally refers to a single sender or a single receiver.
 Broadcast: Sending data to all possible destinations. For example, to send to all addresses within a network with the prefix 192.0.2, the directed broadcast IP address is 192.0.2.255.
 Multicast: A multicast address is associated with a group of interested receivers. According to RFC 3171, addresses 224.0.0.0 to 239.255.255.255 are designated as multicast addresses. Routers take care of making copies of datagrams and sending them to all receivers that have registered their interest in receiving targeted data.
 Anycast: Like broadcast and multicast, anycast is a one-to-many routing topology. However, the data stream is not transmitted to all receivers, just the one which the router decides is the "closest" in the network. Anycast is useful for balancing data loads. It is used in DNS and UDP.

IP Multicast protocols
 Internet Group Management Protocol (IGMP)
 Protocol Independent Multicast (PIM)
 Distance Vector Multicast Routing Protocol (DVMRP)
 Multicast BGP (MBGP)
 Multicast Source Discovery Protocol (MSDP)
 Multicast Listener Discovery (MLD)
 GARP Multicast Registration Protocol (GMRP)
 Multicast DNS (mDNS)
 SMART Multicast (SMART)

See also 
 dense multicast
 sparse multicast
 source-specific multicast
 core-based trees
 Multicast address
 Multicast

Internet protocols

cs:IP Multicast
de:Multicast
es:Multidifusión
no:IP Multicast
pl:IP Multicast